Walang Iwanan is a documentary that original aired on October 12, 2008, on ABS-CBN.  It features the biggest names in Philippine business presented by Charo Santos-Concio, president of ABS-CBN and hosted by the network's top anchors and hosts Korina Sanchez, Karen Davila, Ces Drilon, Henry Omaga-Diaz, Julius Babao, Bernadette Sembrano, Pinky Webb, Alex Santos, Kim Atienza and PROBE's Cheche Lazaro.

Segments
Yamang Pinaghirapan (Hard-earned Wealth)
Soccoro Ramos by Pinky Webb
Henry Sy by Ces Oreña-Drilon
Lance Gokongwei by Julius Babao
Lucio Tan by Bernadette Sembrano
Manny Pangilinan by Karen Davila
Cecilio Pedro by Kim Atienza
Mahirap Maging Mayaman (It's Not Easy Being Rich)
Ramon del Rosario by Alex Santos
Fernando Zobel de Ayala by Cheche Lazaro
Jose Concepcion Jr by Henry Omaga-Diaz
Oscar Lopez by Korina Sanchez

See also
 List of shows previously aired by ABS-CBN

References

ABS-CBN television specials
2008 television specials